HMS Curacoa was a C-class light cruiser built for the Royal Navy during the First World War. She was one of the five ships of the Ceres sub-class and spent much of her career as a flagship. The ship was assigned to the Harwich Force during the war, but saw little action as she was completed less than a year before the war ended. Briefly assigned to the Atlantic Fleet in early 1919, Curacoa was deployed to the Baltic in May to support anti-Bolshevik forces during the British campaign in the Baltic during the Russian Civil War. Shortly thereafter the ship struck a naval mine and had to return home for repairs.

After spending the rest of 1919 and 1920 in reserve, she rejoined the Atlantic Fleet until 1928, aside from a temporary transfer to the Mediterranean Fleet in 19221923 to support British interests in Turkey during the Chanak Crisis. Curacoa was transferred to the Mediterranean Fleet in 1929.

In 1933, Curacoa became a training ship and in July 1939, two months before the start of the Second World War, she was converted into an anti-aircraft cruiser. She returned to service in January 1940 and, while providing escort in the Norwegian Campaign that April, was damaged by German aircraft. After repairs were completed that year, she escorted convoys in and around the British Isles for two years. In late 1942, during escort duty, she was accidentally sliced in half and sunk by the ocean liner , with the loss of 337 men.

Design and description
The C-class cruisers were intended to escort the fleet and defend it against enemy destroyers attempting to come within torpedo range. The Ceres sub-class was a slightly larger and improved version of the preceding Caledon sub-class.

She carried  of fuel oil. The ship had a crew of about 460 officers and ratings.

The main armament of the Ceres-class ships consisted of five BL 6-inch (152 mm) Mk XII guns that were mounted on the centreline and designated '1' to '5' from front to rear. While identical in number to the Caledons, the layout was considerably improved in a number of ways. The gun formerly between the bridge and fore funnel was moved to a superfiring position over the forward gun with wider firing arc than in its old position. The others were also moved, one aft of the rear funnel, and the last two were in the stern, with one gun superfiring over the rearmost gun. The two QF  20-cwt anti-aircraft (AA) guns were positioned abreast the fore funnel. The torpedo armament of the Ceres class ships was identical to that of the Caledons, with eight  torpedo tubes in four twin mounts, two on each broadside. Unlike her sister ships, her conning tower was removed before she was completed.

Construction and career

Curacoa was ordered in March–April 1916 as part of the Repeat War Programme. She was the fourth ship of her name to serve in the Royal Navy and named to commemorate the capture of the Dutch island of Curaçao in 1807. The ship was laid down at Pembroke Royal Dockyard on 13 July. She was launched on 5 May 1917 and completed on 18 February 1918. Her first commander was Captain Barry Domvile. On commissioning, Curacoa became flagship of the 5th Light Cruiser Squadron, part of the Harwich Force, serving there for the rest of the war. In association with John Cyril Porte's birthday and a medal ceremony at RNAS Felixstowe, her crew was inspected by King George V at Harwich on 26 February. From June onwards, she participated in reconnaissance sweeps ordered by Rear-Admiral Reginald Tyrwhitt, commander of the Harwich Force. Sometime in 1918, a pair of 2-pounder (40 mm) Mk II "pom-pom" light AA guns were installed.

In April 1919, Curacoa joined the 1st Light Cruiser Squadron of the newly established Atlantic Fleet. The following month, however, she was deployed to the Baltic as part of the British intervention in the Russian Civil War in support of the White Russians against the Bolsheviks. On 7 May, Rear-Admiral Walter Cowan transferred his flag to the ship from her half-sister . One crewman was killed and three injured by the explosion. Cowan, who was taking a bath at the time, was dumped out of the bath, running to the bridge dressed only in an overcoat until clothing could be brought up from his "day cabin". Curacoa was able to reach a speed of  after some repairs and reached Reval later that day. After temporary repairs there, she returned to the UK for permanent repairs at Sheerness Dockyard; her rudder fell off while passing The Skaw and the ship could only be steered with her engines for the last  to the dockyard.

Curacoa was under repair through July and was placed in reserve after the repairs were completed. She remained in reserve through November 1920, but later served as the flagship of the 2nd Light Cruiser Squadron of the Atlantic Fleet through 1928. The ship was detached to the Mediterranean Fleet in September 1922 during the Chanak Crisis and arrived in Smyrna (now Izmir), Turkey, on 23 September. While there her crew assisted with the evacuation of refugees from the city after much of the city was destroyed by fire. Curacoa remained in the Mediterranean until at least February 1923. During the mid-1920s, her original  rangefinders were exchanged for  models.

On 4 September 1929, the ship was transferred to the Mediterranean Fleet as the flagship of the 3rd Cruiser Squadron, which was commanded by her first captain, Barry Domvile. She remained in the Mediterranean until 1932. She became a gunnery training ship on 18 December 1933 and continued in that role until 1939. In 1935, she was one of four Royal Navy ships featured in the British film Brown on Resolution, where she played a German battlecruiser. In July 1939, a few months before the outbreak of the Second World War in Europe, she began a conversion into an anti-aircraft cruiser at Chatham Dockyard. This consisted of replacing all of her six-inch guns with eight QF 4-inch (102 mm) Mk XVI dual-purpose guns in four twin-gun turrets, in the positions formerly occupied by Nos. 1, 3, 4, and 5 six-inch guns. A quadruple mount for the two-pounder Mk VII "pom-pom" light AA gun was installed in No. 2 gun's position. Quadruple Vickers  AA machinegun mounts replaced the three-inch guns and her torpedo tubes were removed. Her masts were cut down and her existing fire-control systems were replaced by a pair of High-Angle Control System Mk III systems and a pom-pom director. A Type 279 early-warning radar was also installed. To counter the additional weight high in the ship,  of ballast was added.

Second World War

The conversion was completed on 24 January 1940 and Curacoa was assigned to the Home Fleet. During the Norwegian Campaign, the ship escorted a British troop convoy to Åndalsnes (Operation Sickle) in mid-April. Together with the light cruiser , Curacoa landed the battalion of the Sherwood Foresters at Molde; the quay at Åndalsnes had proved to be too small to allow more than one cruiser at a time to disembark their troops before daylight. Curacoa returned home, but was ordered back to Åndalsnes to protect the beachhead there from German aircraft, arriving on 22 April. Repeatedly attacked over the next several days, the ship was hit on the forecastle by a  bomb dropped by a bomber from the Third Group of Demonstration Wing 1 (III./Lehrgeschwader 1) on the evening of the 24th. The bomb killed eight crewmen, who were buried at Veblungsnes after the ship returned home for repairs. Several hours before she was hit, her captain reported that she was running low on four-inch ammunition.

After her repairs were completed, Curacoa was assigned to the Western Approaches where she escorted convoys in and around the British Isles for most of the next two years. By September 1941, Type 285 and Type 282 fire-control radars had been fitted. As part of the deception efforts for Convoy PQ 17, the ship formed part of a decoy convoy that sailed on 29 June 1942, but was not spotted by the Germans. By September 1942, her anti-aircraft suite had been reinforced by five single mounts for  Oerlikon light AA guns; a Type 273 long-range surface-search radar was added.

Collision

On the morning of 2 October 1942, Curacoa rendezvoused north of Ireland with the ocean liner Queen Mary, which was carrying approximately 10,000 American troops of the 29th Infantry Division.

Each captain had different interpretations of The Rule of the Road believing his ship had the right of way. Captain John Wilfred Boutwood of Curacoa kept to the liner's mean course to maximize his ability to defend the liner from enemy aircraft, while Commodore Sir Cyril Gordon Illingworth of Queen Mary continued their zig-zag pattern expecting the escort cruiser to give way.

At 13:32, during the zig-zag, it became apparent that Queen Mary would come too close to the cruiser and the liner's officer of the watch interrupted the turn to avoid Curacoa. Upon hearing this command, Illingworth told his officer to: "Carry on with the zig-zag. These chaps are used to escorting; they will keep out of your way and won't interfere with you." At 14:04, Queen Mary started the starboard turn from a position slightly behind the cruiser and at a distance of two cables (about ). Boutwood perceived the danger, but the distance was too close for either of the hard turns ordered for each ship to make any difference at the speeds that they were travelling. Queen Mary struck Curacoa amidships at full speed, cutting the cruiser in half. The aft end sank almost immediately, but the rest of the ship stayed on the surface a few minutes longer.

Acting under orders not to stop due to the risk of U-boat attacks, Queen Mary steamed onwards with a damaged bow. Lost with Curacoa were 337 officers and men of her crew, according to the naval casualty file released by The United Kingdom National Archives in June 2013. Most of the lost men are commemorated on the Chatham Naval Memorial and the rest on the Portsmouth Naval Memorial. Those who died after rescue, or whose bodies were recovered, were buried in Chatham and in Ashaig Cemetery on the Isle of Skye. Under the Protection of Military Remains Act 1986, Curacoas wrecksite is designated a "protected place".

Those who witnessed the collision were sworn to secrecy due to national security concerns. The loss was not publicly reported until after the war ended, although the Admiralty filed a writ against Queen Mary'''s owners, Cunard White Star Line, on 22 September 1943 in the Admiralty Court of the High Court of Justice. Little happened until 1945, when the case went to trial in June; it was adjourned to November and then to December 1946. Mr. Justice Pilcher exonerated Queen Marys crew and her owners from blame on 21 January 1947 and laid all fault on Curacoas officers. The Admiralty appealed his ruling and the Court of Appeal modified the ruling, assigning two-thirds of the blame to the Admiralty and one third to Cunard White Star. The latter appealed to the House of Lords, but the decision was upheld.

Notes

Footnotes

 Bibliography 
 
 
 
 
 
 
 
 
 
 
 
 
 
 
 
 
 
 
 
 
 

Further reading

 Niven, David. (1981). Go Slowly Come Back Quickly''. . Pages 121–123 describe the incident

External links

 HMS Curacoa on naval-history.net

 

C-class cruisers
Ships built in Pembroke Dock
1917 ships
World War I cruisers of the United Kingdom
World War II cruisers of the United Kingdom
Maritime incidents in October 1942
Ships sunk in collisions
World War II shipwrecks in the Atlantic Ocean
Protected Wrecks of the United Kingdom
Maritime incidents in Ireland
Shipwrecks of Ireland